The Orstkhoy, exonyms: Karabulaks, Balsu, Baloy are a historical ethnoterritorial society among the Chechen and Ingush people. Their homeland is in the upper reaches of the Assa and Fortanga rivers in the historical region of Orstkhoy-Mokhk (modern most of the Sunzhensky District of Ingushetia, the Sernovodsky District of the Chechen Republic and the border part of the Achkhoi-Martan region of Chechnya, Russia). In the tradition of the Chechen ethno-hierarchy, it is considered one of the nine historical Chechen tukkhums, in the Ingush tradition as one of the seven historical Ingush shahars.

General information

Ethnicity 
Ingush Origins 

The first descriptions of the Orstkhoys by European authors in the second half of the 18th century identified them with the Ingush. In particular, J. A. Güldenstädt calls some large Orstkhoy villages as a part of Ingushetia proper and opposes them to Chechens. Güldenstädt also refers to their language as Chechen and says that all Kists (in this case Nakh Peoples) can also be called Midzhegi (an old term for Chechens).  Ten years later, L. L. Shteder, while making notes about the Karabulaks, provides a matching description to the unique details of typical Ingush vestments, which are not characteristic of any other of the people of the Caucasus. The German scientist Professor Johann Gottlieb Georgi, in his fundamental encyclopedic Description of all the peoples living in the Russian state wrote about Karabulaks stating that, "Before anything they were called Yugush, but they call themselves Arshtas,... Their language consists of Kistin and Chechen dialects." while another German scientist, P. S. Pallas, also argued that the Karabulaks come precisely from the Ingush (Ghalghaï). Subsequently, S. M. Bronevsky confirmed the identity of the Orstkhois with the Ingush.

In the Russian Empire, on the basis of scientific, statistical and ethnographic data, the Orstkhoys, under the name Karabulaks, were officially classified as Ingush alongside Galashians, Nazranians, and other Ingush societies. The Orstkhoys were perceived as Ingush by Imperial Russia, as well as in the Imamate of Imam Shamil. In Soviet times, they were also officially included in the Ingush, as reflected on their passports. In the scientific community in the second half of the 20th to the early 21st century, the ethnicity of the Orstkhoys is defined as one of the Ingush societies. Many authors of 19-21th centuries such as Ivanov, Volkonsky, Rzhevuskiy, Maksimov, Vertepov, Pantyukhov, Kovalevsky, Milyutin, Martirosian, Krupnov and Pavlova indicated that they believed the Orstkhoy to be a Ingush society.

In the censuses conducted before the Deportation, the vast majority of population was Ingush.

Chechen Origins: 
In several encyclopedic dictionaries of the late 19th and early 20th centuries, Karabulaks (Orstkhoys) are attributed to the Chechen people:
 

Historian N. F. Dubrovin in 1871 in his historical work History of war and dominion of Russians in the Caucasus states the following: in addition to these societies, the Chechen tribe is divided into many generations, which are named by Russians by the names of auls, or mountains, or rivers, in the direction of which their auls were located. For example, Karabulaki (Orstkhoevtsy), on a plain irrigated by the rivers Assa, Sunzha, and Fortanga, etc.

The military historian A. L. Zisserman, who served 25 years in the Caucasus, also mentions the Karabulaks in his book, stating  "All this valley up to the right bank of the Terek River is inhabited…. Karabulaks and Chechens, etc., belonging by language and customs, with insignificant differences and shades, to one Chechen tribe (Nakhche)."

In the Bulletin of the Imperial Russian Geographical Society for 1859, Karabulaki-Orstkhois are noted as Chechens.

The encyclopedia of Brockhaus and Efron mentions the Orstkhoys as one of the Chechen societies.

19th Century Caucasian military historian V. A. Potto attributed the Karabulks to the Chechen people: "Chechens are usually divided into many groups, or societies, giving them a name from the rivers and mountains on which they lived, or from significant auls that reveal influence on others. Such are the Aldins, the Atagins, the Karabulaks (Orstkhoys), the Michikians, the Kachkalyks, the Ichkerinians, the Aukhovites, and others, and others. But this division of the Chechen people into many separate clans was done, however, by Russians and, in the strict sense, matters only for them. It is completely unknown to the locals. The Chechens themselves call themselves Nakhche, that is, the people, and this name applies equally to all tribes and generations that speak the Chechen language and its dialects."

In the Great Encyclopedia, in the section Chechens, the following information is given about Karabulaki: Georgians call their Chechens Kista, Lezgins have Mizjegi, they call themselves Nakhchi. Chechens also include, Ichkerians in the Vedeno district, Karabulaks who lived in Assa and Sunzha, moved to Turkey.

Many authors who wrote before 1917 emphasized the ethnic unity of the Karabulaks within the rest of the Chechen tribes. I. A. Guldenshtedt, S. M. Bronevsky, R. F. Rosen, I. I. Nordenstam, A. P. Berzhe, U. Laudaev and others were attributed the Karabulaks to the Chechens people. Nordenstam remarked that "Karabulaki, Aukhites and Kachkalyk people speak dialects of the Chechen language. Baron R. F. Rosen believed that the Chechens are divided … into societies under the name of Chechens themselves or Mechigiz, Kachkalyks, Mechikovites, Aukhites and Karabulaks …"

According to Jacob Reineggs (1780), the Ingush language differs from the language of the Karabulaks. He notes that, "Having taken the language into consideration, we can fairly conclude that these peoples had different origins, because what the Ingush says is his neighbor, a Kist, sharing with him only one small river, does not understand, and both of them cannot answer Karabulak in his language."

M. R. Ovkhadov is the only linguist who has specifically studied the Karabulak language. On the basis of field scientific materials, he classified their language as the Orstkhoi dialect of the Galanchozh dialect of the Chechen language.

Over 20 native highland villages of all Orstkhoy: Tsecha-Akhke, Mereji, Gerite, Muzhgan, etc. in the censuses conducted before the deportation, showed that the entire population considered themselves Chechen.

Modern times 
A well-known appeal through the newspaper of the initiative group of the Orstkhoys, outraged by some Chechen researchers who classify the Orstkhois as Chechens. According to the sender of the appeal, the data about the appearance of thousands of Orstkhois … cause a smile or bewilderment, but we do not take this seriously … ".

History

Chronology of major events 

 1807 — "Pacification" of the Orstkhoys by Russian troops led by Major General . Military historian V. A. Potto called this act "the last feat of Likhachev's fifteen years of service in the Caucasus".
 1825 — Russian troops made a military expedition to the Orstkhoy settlements along the rivers of Assa and Fortanga.
 1827 — Another recognition of Russian citizenship by the Orstkhoys. Along with some other North Caucasian peoples, the Orstkhoys swore allegiance to Russia thanks to the actions of the commander of the troops on the Caucasian line, in the Black Sea and Astrakhan (as well as the head of the Caucasus Governorate) - General G. A. Emmanuel, who was rewarded for this accession, made not by force of arms, but smart orders, was granted the Order of St. Alexander Nevsky.
 1858 — the Orstkhoys, together with the Nazranians, the Galashians and the inhabitants of the Tarskaya Valley, took part in one of the episodes of the Great Caucasian War - the Nazran uprising, which ended unsuccessfully.
 1865 — (after the end of the war) — several thousand Orstkhoys were evicted/resettled in Turkey , in particular 1366 families, in fact, the main part of them - in the ESBE it was even reported that the Orstkhoys/Karabulaks are a tribe that “completely moved to Turkey”.

Notes

See also 
 Ingush people
 Ingush societies
 Galashians
 History of Chechnya
 Chechens
 Nakh Peoples

References

Bibliography 
 
 
 
 
 
 
 
 
 
 
 
 
 
 
 
 
 
 
 Dubrovin N. F. Chechens (Nakhche) // Book 1 "Caucasus". History of the war and domination of Russians in the Caucasus. - St. Petersburg: in the printing house of the Department of Goods, 1871. - T. I. - 640 p.
 Nadezhdin P.P. Caucasian mountains and highlanders // Nature and people in the Caucasus and beyond the Caucasus. - St. Petersburg: Printing house of V. Demakov, 1869. - p. 109. - 413 p.
 Berzhe A.P. The eviction of the highlanders from the Caucasus // Russian antiquity. - St. Petersburg, 1882. - T. 36. - No. 10−12.
 Yu. M. Elmurzaev. Pages of the history of the Chechen people. - Grozny: Book, 1993. - S. 7 - 8. - 112 p. — ISBN 5-09-002630-0.
 Encyclopedia of military and marine sciences / edited by G.A. Leer. - St. Petersburg: Type. V. Bezobrazov and Comp., 1889. - T. IV. — 659 s
 Encyclopedic Dictionary, Man - Chuguevsky regiment. - St. Petersburg: F. A. Brockhaus (Leipzig), I. A. Efron (St. Petersburg), 1903. - T. XXXVIII.
 Berger A. P. Chechnya and Chechens. - Tiflis: printed from the Highest H.I.V. permission in the printing house of the Main Directorate of the Viceroy of the Caucasus, 1859. - S. I-VII, 1-140. — 140 p. : from ill. and maps.
 Encyclopedic Dictionary / edited by: prof. Yu. S. Gambarov, prof. V. Ya Zheleznov, prof. M. M. Kovalevsky, prof. S. A. Muromtsev, prof. K. A. Timirzyaev. - Moscow: Russian Bibliographic Institute Granat, 1930. - T. 48.
 Tsalikov A. T. The Caucasus and the Volga region. - Moscow: M. Mukhtarov, 1913. - p. 35. - 184 p. - History, Ethnology of individual territories.
 Rittikh A. F. IX // Tribal composition of the contingents of the Russian army and the male population of European Russia. - St. Petersburg: Type. Cartographic institution A. A. Ilyin, 1875. - p. 331. - 352 p.
 Tkachev G. A. Ingush and Chechens in the family of nationalities of the Terek region. - Vladikavkaz: Terek region. board, 1911. - p. 150. - 152 p.
 
  // История ингушского народа.

Nakh peoples
Ingushetia
Ingush societies
Chechnya